The 1900 Colgate football team represented Colgate University in the 1900 college football season. Colgate reports the record for the season as 3–7, however, a reporting error in early record keeping mistakenly tracked a loss to Colgate Academy as a win.

Schedule

References

Colgate
Colgate Raiders football seasons
Colgate football